The Bryan Tower is a skyscraper in Dallas, Texas. The building rises . It contains 40 floors, and was completed in 1973. The Bryan Tower currently stands as the 19th-tallest building in the city. The architect who designed the building was Neuhaus & Taylor. The building is known for its distinctive gold-tinted windows and the steel beams that run up and down the building.

In 1998, Randall D. Smith acquired the Bryan Tower, and his son Caleb Smith oversaw the renovation for his father's company Spire Realty, which he now runs.

In popular culture
Exterior shots of the building were used as the home of Ewing Oil in the original 5-part miniseries Dallas, now referred to as Season One of the popular 1980s television series Dallas.

References

External links
 Bryan Tower on Emporis
 Bryan Tower on SkyscraperPage

Skyscraper office buildings in Dallas
Office buildings completed in 1973